Junk may refer to:

Arts and entertainment
 Junk (film), a 2000 Japanese horror film
 J-U-N-K, a 1920 American film
 Junk (novel), by Melvin Burgess, 1996
 Junk, a novel by Christopher Largen

Music

Groups
 Junk (band), a British pop band

Albums
 Junk, by Ferry Corsten, 2006
 Junk, by Jejune, 1997
 Junk, by Junk (band), 1995
 Junk (M83 album), 2016

Songs
 "Junk" (song), written by Paul McCartney in 1970
 "Junk", song from Zico Chain's Food album

Other uses in arts and entertainment
 Junk: Record of the Last Hero, a shōnen manga series by Kia Asamiya
 Junk: The Golden Age of Debt, a play by Ayad Akhtar

Finance
 Junk bond
 Junk status, a debt credit rating

People
 Bruno Junk (1929–1995), Estonian race walker, two-time Olympic bronze medal winner
 Janson Junk (born 1996), American baseball pitcher
 Sebastian Junk (born 1983), German Paralympic judoka
 Wilhelm Junk (1866–1942), Czech-born antiquarian bookseller and entomologist

Places
 Junk Bay, Hong Kong
 Fat Tong Chau, Junk Island in English, a former island of Hong Kong
 Pulau Jong or Junk Island, off the coast of Singapore
 Junk, an islet near Hoy, Shetland, Scotland

Slang
 Heroin
 Human male sex organ
 Off-speed pitch, in baseball, also called junk
 Salt-cured meat, frequently called junk

Other uses
 Junk (ship), a type of Chinese sailing vessel
 Junk, sperm whale equivalent of the melon (cetacean)
 Junk data, any file or byte of data that does not serve any real purpose other than wasting space

See also
 Junk drawer
 Junk food
 Junk mail (disambiguation)